Guilherme Finkler (born 24 September 1985) is a retired Brazilian footballer who played as an attacking midfielder. He is known as Guilherme in Brazil and Gui Finkler in Australia and New Zealand.

Early life
Finkler was born in Caxias do Sul in the Brazilian state of Rio Grande do Sul in 1985.

Finkler has a wife, Karine, and a daughter, Rafaela.

Club career

Early career
Finkler played for Brazilian side Juventude, scoring four times in 15 appearances in the 2006 season. Upon returning from a long spell at Cianorte he played in three further matches in 2007. Finkler's subsequent Brazilian club was Juventude's city rival, Caxias.

England and Belgium
During the 2006-2007 season, Finkler played for Wolverhampton Wanderers in the EFL Championship. After scoring several goals in pre-season games the club took the season-long loan option on Finkler. However, he never made a first-team appearance in competitive games. His loan was cut short in January 2007 by mutual consent. Finkler continued his stay in Europe throughout the 2006–2007 season on loan at Belgian Pro League club Mouscron.

Melbourne Victory
Finkler signed for Melbourne Victory on 22 June 2012, before the 2012–13 A-League season.

Season 2012–2013
Finkler made his debut for the Victory in round 1 against crosstown rivals Melbourne Heart. After playing regularly for the Victory, Finkler suffered a season-ending injury in round 12 against A-League debutant club Western Sydney Wanderers. His anterior cruciate ligament (ACL) was ruptured in a heavy tackle. The injury took Finkler out of the game for nearly a year. Before his injury, Finkler had been leading the A-League season 2012/2013 assists count with eight. He made his return to football in the 2013–2014 season.

Season 2013–2014

Finkler made substitute appearances in the opening 0–0 draw with Melbourne Heart and in round 2 visiting Adelaide. Finkler scored his first goal for Melbourne Victory (also Victory's first goal of the season), in a 2–2 draw against Adelaide United.

After the departure of Ange Postecoglou to coach the Australian national team, assistant-turned-manager Kevin Muscat had Finkler play the final 10–25 minutes of matches to build up match fitness and strengthen his post-operation knee. In a game against Perth Glory on Friday 13 December 2013, Guilherme came off the bench for the final 17 minutes and scored his first ever home goal following Adama Traore's solitary goal of the season, to make it 2–0.

The final derby with John Aloisi in charge of the Heart took place with both teams desperate for a win. Heart had not won a match since a 3–1 win over Sydney in February 2013, and Victory to try to stay in the top 5. Again Finkler started the game on the bench. Troisi scored a goal and was subbed for Finkler after just under an hour, and Finkler laid up Mitch Nichols with a sublime pass to put Victory 3–0 up against the 10-man Heart. Finkler's improvement after returning from injury led to more time on the pitch and a regular starting XI place.

Finkler scored against Western Sydney Wanderers with a free kick taken at the end of the match to save the game for the Victory. Melbourne Victory coach Kevin Muscat and Western Sydney Wanderers coach Tony Popovic both praised the goal, which was taken from close to the same spot that Finkler had used an earlier free kick from to cross the ball in. These tactics were not working, and with Finkler taking several corners from the RHS, it was unlikely the Wanderer's defense would be breached with a cross. Deep into injury time, Victory won a free kick 30 yards from goal, taken by Finkler. He decided not to curve the ball into the smaller Victory forward line to be again cleared by the WSW defense, and took Ante Covic the WSW keeper, as well as many teammates and the opposition defense by surprise by having a shot and scoring a memorable goal to draw the match, ending a pattern of home defeats by WSW.

On Saturday 4 January 2014, Guilherme Finkler was named in the Melbourne Victory starting XI for the first time since his knee injury sustained exactly one year and one day prior. his knee for his club's match against Brisbane Roar. He was subbed off after just over an hour against league leaders Brisbane Roar, with the score 0–1, when Victory had a defender sent off.

On 14 January 2014, Finkler appeared as a substitute for Andrew Nabbout after 19 minutes in a game against Western Sydney. The match lasted for longer than most, with two drinks breaks per half due to the heatwave that was over Melbourne (which affected working conditions in several professions, and other sports including the Australian Open, seeing compulsory breaks in play). Finkler scored his fourth goal for the season in the 90th(+6) minute to make the score 3–1 to his team.

On 22 February, Finkler scored two goals and played a full match for the first time in the season as the game against Adelaide United finished 4–3 in his club's favor.

Finkler scored his club's first penalty of the season against Perth on New Year's Eve, 2013, in the absence of the previous season's penalty taker Mark Milligan.

In the final home and away match, in Wellington on 12 April 2014, Finkler provided an assist and scored his 8th goal of season.

Finkler scored his 9th goal of the season in the final minutes of regulation time at Docklands Stadium versus Sydney FC – a team that had beaten Victory 5–0 last time they played there, on 26 January 2014 (Australia Day). Sydney also beat Victory 3–2 in Sydney, and in the 3rd home-and-away match of 2013/14, at Melbourne Rectangular Stadium on 29 March in Melbourne's final home match of the season Sydney scored first in a 1–1 draw. It would be fair to say that Sydney FC were Victory's "bogey team" in 2013/14. However Finkler scored a dramatic late goal to get a result

Finkler's growing popularity at Melbourne Victory with his two-year contract ending on 30 April 2014 fast approaching sparked media interest in his future, however Gui did not give any indication to journalists regarding where he would be playing after that date – the upcoming playoff for a position in the group stage of the Asian Champions League required a total of 3 internationals + 1 additional Asian player, but Finkler was not included: instead Kevin Muscat selected defenders Pablo Contreras (Victory's 2013/14 international marquee player) and Adama Traore, who was at that time an international player (on 4 April he became an Australian citizen, less than a month before leaving Melbourne Victory to play in Europe), and forward Kosta Barbarouses as the third, without taking advantage of the ability to sign a fourth player from another AFC country.  Finkler's omission from the playoff with Muangthong United meant that he could not participate in the group stage either. However at the time the team list was submitted to the ACL, Finkler was being slowly integrated back into the side as he recovered from his injury. After falling short of qualifying for the last 16 by 1 on goal difference, it was a frustrating end to the season, to be denied clear penalties in the dying minutes of the final ACL group match, then unbelievably similarly in the semi-final in Brisbane against the eventual champions Roar. After the sad news that star defender Adama Traore was departing the A-League just weeks after obtaining citizenship and lighting up the Twittersphere with the hashtag #aussieadama, and days after winning the Victory Medal, Melbourne Victory released some positive news: Guilherme Finkler had signed a two-year contract, electing to stay at the Victory along with stalwarts Archie Thompson and Adrian Leijder, strikers Kosta Barbarouses, contracted for 2014/15, and new signing Besart Berisha, whose contract runs for the same amount of time as Finkler's – up until the end of the 2015/16 season.

Season 2014–2015
On 9 May 2014 Melbourne Victory signed Guilherme Finkler for a further two years.

The midfielder played injury-free, amassing 10 assists and 7 goals and helping his club win the A-league in Australia.

On 24 March 2016, Finkler advised the Victory that he would leave them at the end of the season to join Wellington Phoenix FC.

Honours 

Melbourne Victory
 A-League Premiers: 2014-15
 A-League Championship: 2014-15
 FFA Cup: 2015

Individual
 A-League PFA Team of the Season: 2014-15
 A-League All Stars: 2014

References

External links
 Melbourne Victory profile 
 Ultimate A-league Statistics
 
 soFIFA Profile

Living people
1985 births
Brazilian footballers
Brazilian people of German descent
Association football midfielders
Esporte Clube Juventude players
ABC Futebol Clube players
Grêmio Esportivo Brasil players
Esporte Clube São José players
Campinense Clube players
Sociedade Esportiva e Recreativa Caxias do Sul players
Ituano FC players
Wolverhampton Wanderers F.C. players
Royal Excel Mouscron players
Melbourne Victory FC players
Wellington Phoenix FC players
Brazilian expatriate footballers
Expatriate soccer players in Australia
A-League Men players
Marquee players (A-League Men)
Brazilian expatriate sportspeople in Australia
Brazilian expatriate sportspeople in England
Brazilian expatriate sportspeople in Belgium
Expatriate footballers in England
Expatriate footballers in Belgium
Brazilian expatriate sportspeople in New Zealand
Expatriate association footballers in New Zealand